New Jersey Motorsports Park is a road course "Motorsports Entertainment Complex" located in Millville, Cumberland County, New Jersey, United States. It has hosted races since opening in 2008 and currently hosts a schedule including MotoAmerica Pro Road Racing, 24 Hours of LeMons, American Historic Racing Motorcycle Association, SCCA events, SCCA Pro Racing's F2000 Championship Series. It is not to be confused with the New Jersey Motorsports Park: Field of Dreams, an unaffiliated Motocross facility across the street.

Current tracks and facilities

Thunderbolt and Lightning Raceways
New Jersey Motorsports Park is located on 500 acres immediately adjacent to the Millville Municipal Airport, a location that was dedicated in 1941 as America's First Defense Airport, which played a key role in the country's World War II military efforts.

NJMP is one of the few facilities in the world housing two circuits that can be operated simultaneously. The tracks both feature many elevation changes, along with lengthy front straightaways. One of the best known features of this course is a stretch on Thunderbolt Raceway known as "the Jersey devil."

The Park offers open seating which allows spectators to venture throughout the grounds. Grandstands are available in several locations, in addition to camping areas and on-site hotel and condominium accommodations. The facility includes a full-service bar and restaurant, The Finish Line Pub, located at the center of the property.

Go-karting 
In addition to the two road courses, NJMP includes a  karting facility called Tempest Raceway. Like the park itself, Tempest consists of two tracks that can be operated simultaneously. It hosts daily arrive-and-drive programs, and offers custom experiences for groups. The complex also hosts competition events sanctioned by various regional and national series.

In 2011 The Motorsports park declared Chapter 11 bankruptcy, defaulting on its contracts with the City of Millville.

Millville Army Air Field
 
The Millville Army Air Field opened as a gunnery school for fighter pilots for the Republic P-47 “Thunderbolt” in 1941. During its four-year existence, about 1,500 pilots received advanced P-47 Thunderbolt fighter training here.

New Jersey Motorsports Park commemorated this history by naming its marquee 2.25-mile racetrack “Thunderbolt Raceway.” The 1.9-mile road course – Lightning Raceway – is named after the P-38 Lightning, a World War II fighter aircraft.

The facility also carries the historical World War II theme by naming its track-side condominiums “The Villas at Breighton.” Breighton was the name of an allied airfield in Great Britain, where many of the Millville-trained P-47 pilots served during World War II.

Other ties to the World War II theme include the English Tudor design of the clubhouse, the Officers Club's Q-Hangar design that contains Cumberland County's largest banquet facility and the Timing Tower that resembles a World War II air traffic control tower. NJMP safety and security vehicles are based on World War II MP Jeeps.

While building the various structures at New Jersey Motorsports Park, many World War II artifacts were found and collected for display at the Millville Army Air Field Museum, located on the opposite side of the Millville Airport. The Bore Site range, located just outside Thunderbolt Raceway Paddock was used by Thunderbolt pilots during training as a range to calibrate their machine guns.

Today, a P-47 Thunderbolt - No Guts, No Glory aircraft is based out of Millville Airport. It is one of only nine in the world still in working condition.

Lap records 

The official fastest race lap records at the New Jersey Motorsports Park are listed as:

History of racing at the park

Events
NBC's Octane Academy held its east coast qualifier at the Park's 1.9-mile Lightning Raceway in January 2013.

Records 
New Jersey Motorsports Park's slowest hot lap was done in a Ferrari 458 Italia driven by automotive journalist Danny Korecki on the Lightning Circuit. Korecki drove the Ferrari 458 on three consecutive laps while going no faster than 25 miles per hour.

Pro racing 
Many renowned racing series have visited New Jersey Motorsports Park. The first was Grand-Am Road Racing's Rolex Sports Car Series in 2008, with Oswaldo Negri and Mark Patterson capturing the first-ever Thunderbolt trophies. The ARCA Racing Series and AMA Superbike Championship also joined the NJMP schedule, holding annual points-paying races at the Northeast facility. In 2010, SCCA Pro Racing's Trans-Am Series held its first race at Thunderbolt Raceway and returned in 2012, and from 2014 on.

Other notable events include the "Devil in the Dark", a 12-hour endurance race put on by the South Jersey region of the SCCA. Regional and national sportscar and motorcycle clubs also hold hundreds of track-day events at the two circuits each season.

Race history

American Superbike

MotoAmerica Superbike Series

NASCAR K&N Pro Series East

ARCA Racing Series

Rolex Sportscar Series

Trans Am Series

References

External links
 New Jersey Motorsports Park Official Site
 Facility Overview video
 Track History at racing-reference.info
 Trackpedia guide to NJMP
 Track Rental Informational video
 F1 Karting at New Jersey Motorsports Park video
 NJMP Official Photo Gallery (2008-Present)

Millville, New Jersey
Motorsport venues in New Jersey
Buildings and structures in Cumberland County, New Jersey
Sports venues on the National Register of Historic Places in New Jersey
IMSA GT Championship circuits
Tourist attractions in Cumberland County, New Jersey
National Register of Historic Places in Cumberland County, New Jersey
NASCAR tracks
ARCA Menards Series tracks
Road courses in the United States